The Honda CB50 is a , single-cylinder, four-stroke, SOHC street motorcycle manufactured by the Honda Motor Company, from 1971.

References

CB50
Motorcycles introduced in 1971
Standard motorcycles